"Feel the Funk"' is the title of an R&B single by Immature, later known as IMx. It was featured in the 1995 motion picture Dangerous Minds and appeared on the soundtrack and Immature's album We Got It. It was also a b-side to the UK release of the We Got It single.

The song heavily samples the 1979 hit "Love Changes" by the band Mother's Finest.

1995 singles
IMx songs
Songs written by Skip Scarborough
Songs written by Chris Stokes (director)
Contemporary R&B ballads
1990s ballads
1995 songs